is a 2012 Japanese film directed by Tadafumi Itō and based on a novel by Shusuke Michio.

Plot 
Take (Abe Hiroshi) is a middle aged man, who after losing his wife and daughter, decides to become a swindler. He convinces his colleague Tetsu to become one as well, and they both incorporate their 3 housemates, who are lower level/amateur swindlers, into the plan.

Cast
 Hiroshi Abe as Take
 Shoji Murakami as Tetsu
 Satomi Ishihara as Yahiro
 Rena Nōnen as Mahiro
 Yu Koyanagi
 Bengal as Pawn Shop Owner
 Yūsuke Santamaria
 Daimaou Kosaka as Nogami
 Takeshi Nadagi as Tontonei restaurant Employee
 Shingo Tsurumi as Higuchi
 Shigeyuki Totsugi as Tontonei restaurant manager

References

External links
  
 

2012 films
2010s Japanese-language films
Films directed by Tadafumi Itō
Films based on Japanese novels
20th Century Fox films
2010s Japanese films